The UEFA European Championship is one of the major competitive international football tournaments, first played in 1960. The finals stage of the tournament takes place every four years, with a qualifying competition beforehand. The sixteenth tournament was held across Europe in 2021 (postponed from 2020 due to the COVID-19 pandemic).

The England national football team first attempted to qualify for the finals of the tournament in 1964, having declined to enter in 1960. They first qualified in 1968, and have since participated in the finals on ten occasions, including in 1996, when they were the host nation and thus did not need to qualify.

England's best performance at the finals was a runner-up finish at Euro 2020, when they lost the final to Italy on penalties at Wembley. They had a third-place finish in Italy in 1968, when only four teams competed in the finals tournament, and reached one further semi-final in 1996, losing to Germany, also on home soil and on penalties. The team reached the quarter-finals on two other occasions, losing to host nation Portugal on penalties in 2004 and to Italy in Ukraine in 2012, also on penalties.

England were eliminated in the round of 16 by Iceland in 2016. On the other four occasions (1980, 1988, 1992 and 2000), they did not progress beyond the group stage.

Overall record

List of matches

UEFA Euro 1968

Qualifying 

Group stage

Quarter-finals

Final tournament

Semi-finals

Third place play-off

UEFA Euro 1980

Qualifying 

Group stage

Group stage

UEFA Euro 1988

Qualifying 

Group stage

Group stage

UEFA Euro 1992

Qualifying 

Group stage

Group stage

UEFA Euro 1996

Group stage

Knockout stage

Quarter-finals

Semi-finals

UEFA Euro 2000

Qualifying 

Group stage

Play-offs

Group stage

UEFA Euro 2004

Qualifying 

Group stage

Group stage

Knockout stage

Quarter-finals

UEFA Euro 2012

Qualifying 

Group stage

Group stage

Knockout phase

Quarter-finals

UEFA Euro 2016

Qualifying 

Group stage

Group stage

Knockout phase

Round of 16

UEFA Euro 2020

Qualifying 

Group stage

Group stage

Knockout phase

Round of 16

Quarter-finals

Semi-finals

Final

Most appearances

Top scorers

Notes

References

External links
England's team official website
UEFA official site

 
Countries at the UEFA European Championship
History of the England national football team